L-serine dehydratase may refer to:
 Serine dehydratase, an enzyme
 Threonine ammonia-lyase, an enzyme